Sabine Hauert is an Associate Professor in the Bristol Robotics Laboratory at the University of Bristol where her research investigates swarm robotics. Previously she worked at the Massachusetts Institute of Technology (MIT), Carnegie Mellon University (CMU) and the École Polytechnique Fédérale de Lausanne (EPFL) in Switzerland.

Education
Hauert was educated at the École Polytechnique Fédérale de Lausanne (EPFL) where she was awarded Bachelor of Science, Master of Science and Doctor of Philosophy degrees. During her study she participated in a student exchange program at Carnegie Mellon University (CMU). Her PhD on aerial swarm robotics was supervised by Dario Floreano and Jean-Christophe Zufferey and awarded in 2010.

Career and research
Hauert's research investigates swarm intelligence, robotics, nanomedicine and cancer. Her work has appeared in Nature, Science,  the European Parliament, the Royal Society and featured in mainstream media including the BBC, CNN, The Guardian, The Economist, TEDx, Wired, and New Scientist. Hauert is president and co-founder of robohub.org, a nonprofit organization and online communication platform that brings together experts in robotics research, start-ups, business and education from across the globe.

Hauert served as a member of the working group on machine learning at the Royal Society from 2015 to 2017.

Awards and honours
Hauert was a member of the team that won first place at the RoboCup US Open in 2005. She was a selectee at the 63rd Lindau Nobel Laureate Meeting in 2013 and was awarded a postdoctoral fellowship at MIT by the Human Frontier Science Program (HFSP) in 2011.

References

Living people
Women roboticists
Year of birth missing (living people)